John Banner (born Johann Banner, January 28, 1910 – January 28, 1973) was an Austrian-born American actor, best known for his role as Sergeant Schultz in the situation comedy Hogan's Heroes (1965–1971). Schultz, constantly encountering evidence that inmates of his stalag were actively conducting anti-German espionage and sabotage activities, frequently feigned ignorance with the catchphrase, "I see nothing! I hear nothing! I know nothing!" (or, more commonly as the series went on, "I know nothing, nothing!").

Early years
Banner was born 28 January 1910 to Jewish parents in Stanislau, Austria-Hungary (now Ivano-Frankivsk, Ukraine). He studied for a law degree at the University of Vienna, but decided instead to become an actor. In 1938, when he was performing with an acting troupe in Switzerland, Adolf Hitler annexed Austria to Nazi Germany. Banner emigrated to the United States, where he rapidly learned English.

World War II
In 1942, Banner enlisted in the United States Army Air Corps, underwent basic training in Atlantic City and became a supply sergeant. He even posed for a recruiting poster (before he became portly). He served until 1945.

According to fellow Hogan's Heroes actor Robert Clary, who was a Holocaust survivor himself, "John lost a lot of his family" to the Holocaust.

Acting

Broadway
Banner appeared on Broadway three times: in a musical revue called From Vienna, which ran for two months in 1939; and in two comic plays, Pastoral, in which he had a leading role, but which had a very brief run in November 1939; and The Big Two, which ran briefly in January 1947. Early on, before he became fluent in English, Banner had to learn his lines phonetically.

Films
Banner appeared in more than 40 feature films. His first credited role was a German captain in Once Upon a Honeymoon (1942), starring Cary Grant and Ginger Rogers. He also played a Gestapo agent in 20th Century Fox's Chetniks! The Fighting Guerrillas (1943). His typecasting did not please him, but these were the only roles he was offered. Banner later learned that his family members who remained in Vienna had all perished in Nazi concentration camps.

From the 1950s 
Banner made more than 70 television appearances between 1950 and 1970, including the Lone Ranger (episode "Damsels In Distress", 1950), Sky King (premiere episode "Operation Urgent", 1952), Sheena, Queen of the Jungle ("The Renegades", 1955), Adventures of Superman ("The Man Who Made Dreams Come True", 1957), Father Knows Best ("Brief Holiday", 1957), Mister Ed (episode "Ed the Artist", 1965), Thriller (episode "Portrait Without a Face", 1961), The Untouchables ("Takeover", 1962), My Sister Eileen, The Lucy Show, Perry Mason, The Partridge Family, Voyage to the Bottom of the Sea ("Hot Line", 1964), Alias Smith and Jones, The Man from U.N.C.L.E. ("The Neptune Affair", 1964), and Hazel ("The Investor", 1965).

In the late 1950s, a still-slim Banner portrayed Peter Tchaikovsky's supervisor on a Disneyland anthology series about the composer's life. This followed a scene with fellow Hogan's Heroes actor Leon Askin (General Burkhalter) as Nikolai Rubinstein. In 1953, he had a bit part in the Kirk Douglas feature film The Juggler as the witness of an attack on an Israeli policeman by a disturbed concentration camp survivor.

In 1954, he had a regular role playing Bavarro in the children's science-fiction TV series Rocky Jones, Space Ranger. Two years later, he played a train conductor in the episode "Safe Conduct" of Alfred Hitchcock Presents, appearing with future co-star Werner Klemperer (Colonel Klink in Hogan's Heroes), who played a spy. He also played Nazi villains in several later films - the German town mayor in The Young Lions (1958), Rudolf Höss in Operation Eichmann (1961, opposite Werner Klemperer as Adolf Eichmann), and Gregor Strasser in Hitler (1962). The year before the premiere of Hogan's Heroes, Banner portrayed a World War II German "home guard" soldier in 36 Hours (1964), starring James Garner. Although it was a serious role in a war drama, Banner still displayed some of the affable nature that became his defining character trait the following year in Hogan's Heroes. By coincidence, during the final moments of 36 Hours, John Banner's character meets up with a border guard played by Sig Ruman, who had portrayed another prisoner-of-war camp chief guard named Sergeant Schulz in the 1953 film Stalag 17, starring William Holden.

Hogan's Heroes
The comedy series Hogan's Heroes, in which Banner played Sergeant Hans Schultz, the role for which he is most often remembered, debuted on the CBS Television Network in 1965. The character of Schultz is a bumbling, but ultimately lovable German guard at a World War II prisoner-of-war camp. The camp is used by the prisoners as a secret staging area for sabotage and intelligence gathering. To obtain nuggets of information from the commandant's office, the prisoners often bribe Schultz with food and candy. Schultz's main goal is to avoid any trouble with his superiors, which often leads him to ignore the clandestine activities of the prisoners. (On those occasions, he often used his catchphrase "I hear nothing, I see nothing, I know nothing!" As the series went on, this became simply "I know nothing. Nothing!). The genesis of the line could be from Banner’s appearance on the TV crime drama The Untouchables, in the episode "The Takeover" (1961), when confronted by a gangster, he nervously responds with his future classic line. Another signature phrase used was "Jolly joker!", when one of the POWs would make a joke at his expense. Schultz's gentle nature is exemplified by his occupation before the war: he is a toymaker.

Banner was loved not only by the viewers, but also by the cast, as recalled by cast members during the Hogan's Heroes DVD commentary. The Jewish Banner defended his character, telling TV Guide in 1967, "Schultz is not a Nazi. I see Schultz as the representative of some kind of goodness in any generation." Banner appeared in every episode of the series, which ran for six years.

In 1968, during the series' run, Banner co-starred with fellow Hogan's Heroes actors Werner Klemperer, Leon Askin, and Bob Crane in the Cold War comedy The Wicked Dreams of Paula Schultz, starring Elke Sommer in the title role.

After Hogan's Heroes
After Hogan's Heroes was cancelled in 1971, Banner starred as the inept gangster Uncle Latzi in a short-lived television situation comedy, The Chicago Teddy Bears. His last acting appearance was in the March 17, 1972, episode of The Partridge Family. He then retired to France with his Paris-born second wife.

Death
Banner died on January 28, 1973 – his 63rd birthday – following an abdominal hemorrhage. At the time of his death, he was visiting friends in Vienna.

Filmography

Film

Television

See also

References
Notes

External links
 
 
 

1910 births
1973 deaths
20th-century American male actors
20th-century Austrian male actors
American male film actors
American male television actors
American people of Austrian-Jewish descent
Austrian emigrants to the United States
Austrian male film actors
Austrian male television actors
Austro-Hungarian Jews
Deaths from gastrointestinal hemorrhage
Jewish American male actors
Male actors from Vienna
United States Army Air Forces personnel of World War II
United States Army Air Forces soldiers
20th-century American Jews